is a Japanese former footballer. His younger brother Yasuhito is also a footballer.

Club career
Endō was born in Kagoshima on 18 September 1975. After graduating from high school, he joined Yokohama Marinos (later Yokohama F. Marinos) in 1994. He debuted in 1995 and he played many matches as midfielder after the debut. In 1995, the club won the champions J1 League. From 1999, he became a regular player and the club won 2001 J.League Cup, 2003 and 2004 J1 League. However his opportunity to play decreased in 2005 and he moved to Vissel Kobe in July 2005. He retired end of 2007 season.

National team career
In July 1996, Endō was selected Japan U-23 national team for 1996 Summer Olympics. At this tournament, he wore the number 10 shirt for Japan and played 1 match against Brazil in first match. Japan won Brazil and it was known as "Miracle of Miami" (マイアミの奇跡) in Japan.

Club statistics

References

External links

1975 births
Living people
Association football people from Kagoshima Prefecture
Japanese footballers
J1 League players
J2 League players
Yokohama F. Marinos players
Vissel Kobe players
Footballers at the 1996 Summer Olympics
Olympic footballers of Japan
Association football midfielders
People from Kagoshima